Council of Islamic Ideology (CII; is a constitutional body of Pakistan, responsible for giving legal advice on Islamic issues to the government and the Parliament.

This body was founded in 1962 under the government of Ayub Khan.

Functions
The council has the following functions:
 To recommend laws conforming to Quran and Sunnah to the Parliament and Provincial Assemblies.
 To advise the Parliament, Government of Pakistan, President of Pakistan, or Governor on any question referred to the council as to whether a proposed law is or is not repugnant to the Injunctions of Islam.
 To make recommendations to bring current laws into conformity with Islamic injunctions.
 To compile guidance for the Parliament and Provincial Assemblies.

However, the Government can make a law before advice is furnished by the council. The council is also responsible for submitting an annual interim report, which is discussed in the Parliament and Provincial Assemblies within six months of its receipt. Recently, the council was strongly criticized in many traditionalist quarters for its recommendations on the procedure for khula. (See also Talaq (conflict)).

Views 
In 2013, the council rules that DNA testing could not be used as a primary proof in rape cases, but be used as a supplementary proof, they later said it can be used as the main evidence.
The council has also declared human Cloning and sex reassignment surgery as illegal in Islam whereas test tube births were allowed, within certain conditions. It further states that practice of secret recordings as evidence for court cases should not be part of general policy, but it can be done in selected cases.
Regarding the existing law that requires a "written approval" from the first wife if a man wants to go for the second marriage, the council is of the view that these laws are against Islamic principles and therefore should be abolished. Maulana Sheerani chairman of the council said, "The government should amend the law to make the issue of more than one marriage easy and in accordance with Sharia. We urge the government to formulate Sharia-compliant laws related to nikah, divorce, adulthood and will." In spite of this recommendation from CII, in November 2017, a Lahore lower court ruled against a man who married a second woman without obtaining permission from his first wife. He was sentenced to a six-month jail term and fined Rs 2,00,000. 
In a review of marriage laws in March 2014, CII declared them unislamic. According to the council there are two stages of a marriage, Nikah and Rukhsati. While Nikah can be done at any age, Rukhsati can only take place once she reaches the age of puberty and is the responsibility of her guardian.
 The council on 21 January 2019 ruled that Divorcing thrice at once is against the Sunnah of Muhammad, rather it should be given over a period of time, it asked government to make this act punishable. It also ruled that a woman older than 40 can serve as a judge.

Chairmen
 Justice Abu Saleh Muhammad Akram (1 August 1962 - 5 February 1964)
 Prof. Allama Allauddin Siddiqui (6 February 1964 - 31 January 1973)
 Justice Hamoodur Rahman (2 February 1974 - 1 February 1977)
 Justice Mohammad Afzal Cheema (26 September 1977 - 16 May 1980)
 Justice Tanzil-ur-Rahman (27 May 1980 - 30 May 1984)
 Prof. A.W.J. Halepota (7 May 1986 - 6 May 1989)
 Justice Mohammad Haleem (25 February 1990 - 24 February 1993)
 Maulana Kausar Niazi (15 December 1993 - 19 March 1994)
 Iqbal Ahmad Khan (11 June 1994 - 10 June 1997)
 S.M. Zaman (10 September 1997 - 16 October 2003)
 Dr. Muhammad Khalid Masud (16 June 2004 - 14 June 2010)
 Maulana Muhammad Khan Sherani (16 November 2010 - 17 November 2016)
 Dr. Qibla Ayaz (6 November 2017 – present)

Current members
 Qibla Ayaz
 Arif Hussain Wahidi
 Syed Iftikhar Hussain Naqvi
 Abdul Hakeem Akbari
 Pir Fazeel
 Dr. Qari Abdul Rasheed (T.I)
 Syed Muhammad Anwer 
 Fazal-ur-Rahim
 Muhammad Raza Khan
 Manzoor Hussain Gillani
 Muhammad Hanif Jalandhari
 Muhammad Raghib Hussain Naeemi
 Shafiqur Rehman Pasruri
 Abul Muzaffar Ghulam Muhammad Sialvi
 Ahmed Javed
  Khurshid Ahmad Nadeem
 Malik Allah Buksh Kalyar
 Rooh-ul-Husnain Mueen 
 Farkhanda Zia
 Sahibzada Sajid-ur-Rehman

First members
The council was then known as Advisory Council of Islamic Ideology. Its first nine members were:
 Justice Abu Saleh Muhammad Akram, former judge of Federal Court of Pakistan (Chairman)
 Justice Muhammad Sharif, former Judge Supreme Court of Pakistan
 Mohammad Abdul Ghafoor Hazarvi, Punjab, Pakistan
 Mohmmad Akram Khan;
 Abdul Hamid Badayuni, Karachi
 Hafiz Kifayat Husain, Lahore
 Dr. Ishtiaq Hussain Qureshi, Head, Islamic Research Institute, Karachi
 Abdul Hashim, Islamic Academy, Dhaka
 Another member from East Pakistan;
 Syed Najmul Hassan Kararvi

See also 
 Federal Shariat Court
 Human Rights Commission of Pakistan
 Marriage in Pakistan
 Polygyny in Islam

References

External links

Official website - Council of Islamic Ideology

Ideologies
Islam in Pakistan
Conservatism in Pakistan
Political and economic think tanks based in Pakistan
Pakistan federal departments and agencies
Sharia in Pakistan
Government agencies established in 1962
1962 establishments in Pakistan
Transgender law
Transgender in Asia